Colliniidae is a family of ciliates of the order Apostomatida.

References 

Apostomatida
Ciliate families